Beloyarsk Airport  is a public use airport in the Khanty-Mansi Autonomous Okrug in Russia.

Airlines and destinations

References

External links
Beloyarsky Airport Official website 

Airports in Khanty-Mansi Autonomous Okrug